A quasi-satellite is an object in a specific type of co-orbital configuration (1:1 orbital resonance) with a planet (or dwarf planet) where the object stays close to that planet over many orbital periods.

A quasi-satellite's orbit around the Sun takes the same time as the planet's, but has a different eccentricity (usually greater), as shown in the diagram. When viewed from the perspective of the planet by an observer facing the sun, the quasi-satellite will appear to travel in an oblong retrograde loop around the planet. .

In contrast to true satellites, quasi-satellite orbits lie outside the planet's Hill sphere, and are unstable. Over time they tend to evolve to other types of resonant motion, where they no longer remain in the planet's neighborhood, then possibly later move back to a quasi-satellite orbit, etc.

Other types of orbit in a 1:1 resonance with the planet include horseshoe orbits and tadpole orbits around the Lagrangian points, but objects in these orbits do not stay near the planet's longitude over many revolutions about the star. Objects in horseshoe orbits are known to sometimes periodically transfer to a relatively short-lived quasi-satellite orbit, and are sometimes confused with them.

A quasi-satellite is similar to an object in a distant retrograde orbit, in a different context. The latter term is usually used for a space probe or artificial satellite in a retrograde orbit around a moon, and the period may be much shorter than that of the moon, whereas the term "quasi-satellite" usually refers to an object like an asteroid whose period is similar to that of the planet of which it is considered to be a quasi-satellite. But in both cases, the object (asteroid, space probe) viewed in a reference frame that rotates with the two main objects (once a year for Sun-Earth, once a month for Earth-Moon) appears to move retrograde compared to that rotation, thus lengthening its sidereal period. So a quasi-satellite (with low inclination) tends to stay in certain constellations rather than going through the whole zodiac.

The word "geosynchronous" is sometimes used to describe quasi-satellites of the Earth, because their motion around the Sun is synchronized with Earth's. However, this usage is unconventional and confusing. Conventionally, geosynchronous satellites revolve in the prograde sense around the Earth, with orbital periods that are synchronized to the Earth's rotation.

Examples

Venus
Venus has one known quasi-satellite, . This asteroid is also a Mercury- and Earth-crosser; it seems to have been a "companion" to Venus for approximately the last 7,000 years only, and is destined to be ejected from this orbital arrangement about 500 years from now.

Earth

As of 2016, Earth had five known quasi-satellites:
 
 
 
 
 

On the longer term, asteroids can transfer between quasi-satellite orbits and horseshoe orbits, which circulate around Lagrangian points L4 and L5. The time spent in the quasi-satellite phase differs from asteroid to asteroid.

469219 Kamoʻoalewa is thought to be one of the most stable quasi-satellites found yet of Earth. It stays between 38 and 100 lunar distances from the Earth.

Ceres
The dwarf-planet asteroid 1 Ceres is believed to have a quasi-satellite, the as-yet-unnamed .

Neptune
 is a temporary quasi-satellite of Neptune. The object has been a quasi-satellite of Neptune for about 12,500 years and it will remain in that dynamical state for another 12,500 years.

Other planets
Based on simulations, it is believed that Uranus and Neptune could potentially hold quasi-satellites for the age of the Solar System (about 4.5 billion years), but a quasi-satellite's orbit would remain stable for only 10 million years near Jupiter and 100,000 years near Saturn. Jupiter and Saturn are known to have quasi-satellites. , a co-orbital to Jupiter, intermittently becomes a quasi satellite of the planet, and will next become one between 2380 and 2480.

Artificial quasi-satellites
According to computations, it could have then stayed trapped in the vicinity of Phobos for many months. The spacecraft was lost due to a malfunction of the on-board control system.

Accidental quasi-satellites
Some objects are known to be accidental quasi-satellites, which means that they are not forced into the configuration by the gravitational influence of the body of which they are quasi-satellites. The dwarf planets Ceres and Pluto are known to have accidental quasi-satellites. In the case of Pluto, the known accidental quasi-satellite, 15810 Arawn, is, like Pluto, a plutino, and is forced into this configuration by the gravitational influence of Neptune. This dynamical behavior is recurrent, Arawn becomes a quasi-satellite of Pluto every 2.4 Myr and remains in that configuration for nearly 350,000 years.

See also
 Artificial satellite
 Natural satellite
 Temporary satellite
 Satellite system (astronomy)

References

External links

Quasi-satellite Information Page
Astronomy.com: A new "moon" for Earth
Discovery of the first quasi-satellite of Venus – University of Turku news release (August 17, 2004)

Moons